ICCI is a four-letter acronym that stands for:

Islamic Cultural Centre of Ireland, an Islamic complex, including a mosque, in Clonskeagh, Dublin, Ireland
Iowa Citizens for Community Improvement, a membership-based grassroots organization based in Des Moines, Iowa
Islamabad Chamber of Commerce & Industry